Bagra is one of the 44 union councils of Haripur District in Khyber-Pakhtunkhwa province of Pakistan. It is located south east of the district capital, Haripur.

References

Union councils of Haripur District